Célestine Galli-Marié (15 March 1837 – 22 September 1905) was a French mezzo-soprano who is most famous for creating the title role in the opera Carmen.

Career

She was born Marie-Célestine Laurence Marié de l'Isle in Paris. She was taught singing by her father, Mécène Marié de l'Isle, who also had a successful opera career. Her début came in 1859 in Strasbourg, and she sang in Italian in Lisbon. At the age of fifteen she had married a sculptor named Galli (who died in 1861) and thus took her stage name, Galli-Marié.

Émile Perrin, the director of the Opéra-Comique, heard her performing Balfe's The Bohemian Girl at Rouen and brought her to Paris. She sang at the Opéra-Comique until 1885, premiering in Pergolesi's La serva padrona. Her most famous roles were in Thomas's Mignon (1866) and Bizet's Carmen (1875). It was said that at the 33rd performance of Carmen on 2 June 1875, Galli-Marié had a premonition of Bizet's death while singing the cards scene in Act III, and fainted when she left the stage; the composer in fact died that night and the next performance was cancelled due to her indisposition. Undertaking much touring, she performed Carmen in Brussels (16 January 1876), Naples (the Italian premiere), Genoa, Barcelona, Lyon, Liege and Dieppe before returning in the Opéra-Comique revival of the original production on 22 October 1883. In London she appeared at Her Majesty's Theatre in a touring production in 1886, and returned to the Opéra-Comique in 1890 to sing in a fundraising performance to erect a monument to Bizet (this was her final performance).

She also created the roles of Lazarille in Don César de Bazan, Vendredi in Robinson Crusoé, the title part in Fantasio, as well as roles in Lara, Le Capitaine Henriot, Fior d'Aliza, La Petite Fadette, and Piccolino. She also sang Taven in Mireille and Rose Friquet in Les dragons de Villars. Sometime in the late 1860s and early 1870s she and the composer Émile Paladilhe became lovers. Curtiss notes that she kept pet marmosets, and sometimes took them to rehearsal.

She died in Vence, near Nice.

Her voice was described as being of a good timbre, with clear diction and phrasing. A high mezzo-soprano voice was at one time referred to as "Galli-Marié". Galli-Marié parts are now sometimes sung by sopranos.

Family
Irma created roles in L'amour chanteur in 1864 and in Les bergers in 1865; she toured the US before returning to the Paris Opéra-Comique. Paola was prominent in operetta and created roles for Charles Lecocq, appearing a great deal in the US. Galli-Marié and Irma sang together in Madeleine at the Théâtre des Bouffes Parisiens in 1869.

References

Further reading

External links

19th-century French women opera singers
1837 births
1905 deaths
Burials at Père Lachaise Cemetery
Singers from Paris
French operatic mezzo-sopranos